Sandra Jablonskyte (born 8 May 1992) is a Lithuanian judoka.

She is the bronze medallist of the 2019 Judo Grand Slam Ekaterinburg in the +78 kg category. In 2021, she competed in the women's +78 kg event at the 2021 World Judo Championships held in Budapest, Hungary. She also competed in the women's +78 kg event at the 2020 Summer Olympics in Tokyo, Japan.

References

External links
 

1992 births
Living people
Lithuanian female judoka
Judoka at the 2015 European Games
Judoka at the 2019 European Games
European Games competitors for Lithuania
Judoka at the 2020 Summer Olympics
Olympic judoka of Lithuania